Ordered to Forget is a 2014 Russian film directed by Hussein Erkenov.

The film was intended to debut on 10 May 2014 but was banned because the Russian Ministry of Culture officially denies the events of the Khaibakh massacre and claimed the film would create ethnic hatred after denouncing the film as "anti-Russian". The makers of the film stated that they did not wish to promote hatred of Russians, and the film depicts many ethnic Russians characters outright resisting orders to kill Chechen and Ingush civilians issued by NKVD officer Mikhail Gvishiani. Despite the government's ban on showing the film, it was screened at the Moscow International Film Festival.

Synopsis 
The film chronicles the Khaibakh massacre through the lens of the main protagonists Daud and Seda, two fictional characters who were depicted as witnesses of the massacre after fleeing their village.

Cast 
Shamkhan Mitrayev – Daud
Kheda Akhmadova – Seda
Movsar Atayev – Chairman of the village council
Khava Akhmadova – Daud's mother
Timur Badalbeyli – NKVD Colonel
Ruslan Kokonayev – Daud's friend
Roman Kouznechenko – Kasim
Andrey Mekhontsev – soldier
Aleksandr Novin – Duzhak
Roza Khayrullina – Raikhan
Adam Bulduchev
Akhmed Bisayev
Ali Bisitayev
Markha Gayrbekova
Raisa Gichayeva
Mutalip Davletmirzayev
Roman Katyushin
Dagun Omayev
Abu Pashayev
Madina Sanayeva
Apti Sultukhanov
Zarema Ulabayeva
Sanukhat Khakisheva

References 

2014 films
Censored films
Chechen-language films
2010s Russian-language films